Lalmsvatnet is a lake in Vågå Municipality in Innlandet county, Norway. The  lake is a part of the Otta river between the villages of Vågåmo and Lalm in the Ottadalen valley. The Norwegian National Road 15 runs along the north shore of the lake.

See also
List of lakes in Norway

References

Vågå
Lakes of Innlandet